Kolobos (also known as Haunted House) is a 1999 American independent horror movie that was directed by Daniel Liatowitsch and David Todd Ocvirk. The film was released on September 28, 1999 through Armitage Pictures.

Plot summary
The film cuts between scenes of a hospitalized woman (later revealed to be Kyra) who was discovered with severe facial lacerations, speaking only the word "kolobos", as well as a group of young adults who have answered a personal ad seeking people to participate in a Big Brother-esque film. The group is made up of the director, Carl, and five participants, the peppy Tina, actress Erica, Tom the jokester, and Gary the college dropout. The fifth member, Kyra, is an artist living in a group home and taking anxiety medications.

Soon after their arrival the group members find themselves cut off from the outside world via heavy duty security shutters. They must also contend with deadly traps placed in the house and particularly the kitchen, where Tina was eviscerated. Kyra begins to experience visions of faceless doppelgangers after discovering Tina's decapitated head, as well as videos of a man cutting the skin off his face and a mysterious figure in black. Initially Carl is suspected to be the killer, only for this to be proven false after his body is discovered and Erica admits that the two of them were just actors hired to stir up drama. The true mastermind was never seen and never told them that there would be deadly traps. The group unsuccessfully tries to escape through the attic, which they find has also been shuttered. Gary is separated from the group and Kyra flees after experiencing more visions. She comes downstairs to discover the figure in black dragging Tom into a bathroom, where he is murdered. The figure then breaks through the bathroom door and knocks Kyra unconscious. In the attic, Tom and Erica discover several of Kyra's drawings that resemble the traps and deaths that they've seen so far.

Kyra awakens to find that she is now suspected to be the murderer. Tom and Erica lock her in the bathroom as they no longer trust her. They decide to try searching the basement for an exit, as it's the most heavily guarded with traps but are separated before both can successfully make it through the traps. Erica is wounded by one of the traps and then murdered by the figure in black. Kyra, who has managed to escape the bathroom, makes it downstairs and discovers Tom, who still suspects her. The two decide to go into the basement, however Tom once again goes missing. Once downstairs, Kyra sees that all of the murdered people have been strung up as macabre decorations, made to resemble her drawings. She also sees another video of the man peeling his face off just as the figure in black, implied to be the same man, appears and grabs her. He tells Kyra that he granted all of the victims their true forms before forcing her to cut her face while chanting the word kolobus. Kyra manages to turn on him and the two battle, during which she manages to kill him with a pool cue. She then tries to escape via a skylight.

The film cuts back to the hospital, where Kyra is being released. A doctor tells her that the police investigated but were unable to find any evidence or even the house she described. She also explains that the word "kolobos" means "mutilated" and implies that this could have something to do with past memories. Angry over the implications that this was something she did to herself, Kyra leaves. Kyra returns to a fancy home where she begins to hallucinate voices and imagine the traps from the filming house, while also mentioning that it is "just me". She hears the voice of the figure in black, who begs her to touch him. The voice is revealed to belong to a straight razor, which she uses to cut herself. The voice tells her that there is something that it wants her to do. She is then shown placing an identical order to the one given at the beginning of the film, revealing that the events were all in her head and that she is now planning to make them a reality.

Cast
Amy Weber as Kyra
Donny Terranova as Tom
Nichole Pelerine as Erica
John Fairlie as Gary
Promise LaMarco as Tina
Ilia Volok as Faceless
Simms Thomas as Dr. Waldman
Todd Beadle as Dr. Jurgen
Mari Weiss as Lucille
Jonathan Rone as Carl
Linnea Quigley as Dorothy
Ivan Battee as Det. Byers

Reception

Critical reception for Kolobos was mixed to negative, with the Fresno Bee panning the film overall. Beyond Hollywood gave a mixed review where they heavily criticized the film's acting but stated that overall it was a "worthwhile viewing experience". In contrast, DVD Verdict praised the film's acting and commented that Kolobos had "replay value". Flickering Myth noted that the film drew heavy inspiration from Italian cinema, writing "try listening to the main theme and not thinking of Suspiria".

References

External links

1999 films
1999 horror films
American horror films
American independent films
1990s English-language films
1990s American films